The western flycatcher has been split into two species, which are hard to distinguish, and to tell apart from other Empidonax flycatchers.

DNA testing in 2014 confirmed a new field mark, involving the extent of buffy edging on the secondaries, to reliably distinguish these species from the yellow-bellied flycatchers.

Birds known as western flycatcher include the Pacific-slope flycatcher (Empidonax difficilis) and the Cordilleran flycatcher (Empidonax occidentalis).

References

Flycatchers